Robert Schroeder (May 11, 1926 − December 3, 2011) was a racing driver from the United States, born in El Dorado. He lived in Medina, Wisconsin and participated in one Formula One World Championship Grand Prix, the 1962 United States Grand Prix, on October 7, 1962. He finished tenth, seven laps behind the winner, and scored no championship points. He died after suffering from a short period of ill-health and heart problems in a Dallas hospital in 2011.

Complete Formula One World Championship results
(key)

References

American Formula One drivers
Mecom Racing Team Formula One drivers
1926 births
2011 deaths
People from Medina (town), Wisconsin
Racing drivers from Wisconsin